María del Pilar del Río Sánchez (born March 15, 1950) is a Spanish journalist, writer and translator. She is the president of José Saramago Foundation.

Biography 
Pilar del Río was born in Castril (Granada) in 1950, to Antonio and Carmen, the eldest of fifteen children. She worked as a journalist at TVE and Sevilla's Canal Sur.

In 1986, del Río met the Portuguese writer José Saramago after she read all his books translated to Spanish. They got married two years later, in 1988, and decided to live in Lisbon, moving afterwards in 1993 to Lanzarote, one of the Spanish Canary Islands. She lived with José Saramago until his death, in 2010, also translating many of Saramago's works to Spanish. In 2010, after her husband's death, del Río acquired Portuguese citizenship.

Pilar del Río is president of the José Saramago Foundation. On May 26, 2017 she was awarded the Luso-Spanish Arts and Culture Prize at the National Library of Spain.

Works 
 Los andaluces (written with Juan Teba). Barcelona: Editorial Epidauro, 1979.

Translations 
Books by José Saramago which Del Río translated to Spanish:
 Todos os Nomes (Todos los nombres). Madrid: Santillana, 2001. 
 A Caverna (La caverna). Madrid: Santillana, 2001. 
 A Maior Flor do Mundo (La flor más grande del mundo). Madrid: Alfaguara, 2001 
 O Homem Duplicado (El hombre duplicado). Madrid: Alfaguara, 2002. 
 O Conto da Ilha Desconhecida (El cuento de la isla desconocida). Madrid: Suma de Letras, 2002. 
 Ensaio sobre a Lucidez (Ensayo sobre la lucidez). Madrid : Santillana, 2004. 
 As Intermitências da Morte (Las intermitencias de la muerte). Madrid: Alfaguara, 2005. 
 As Pequenas Memórias (Las pequeñas memorias). Madrid: Alfaguara, 2007. 
 A Viagem do Elefante (El viaje del elefante). Madrid: Santillana, 2010. 
 Caim (Caín). Madrid: Punto de Lectura, 2011. 
 Claraboia (Claraboya), (written in 1952). Madrid: Alfaguara, 2011. 
 Alabardas (Alabardas), (unfinished). Madrid: Alfaguara, 2014.

See also 
 José and Pilar, a 2010 documentary about her and Saramago.

References

1950 births
Living people
20th-century Spanish women
21st-century Spanish women
People from the Province of Granada
Portuguese people of Spanish descent
Portuguese–Spanish translators
Spanish journalists
Spanish translators
Spanish women journalists
Spanish women writers
Translators of José Saramago